Events from the year 1512 in Ireland.

Incumbent
Lord: Henry VIII

Events
William Rokeby, Primate of Ireland appointed Lord Chancellor of Ireland

Births

Deaths

References

William Rokeby, Primate of Ireland

 
Ireland
Years of the 16th century in Ireland